Lazar Mitrović (born 18 August 1998) is a Serbian professional footballer who plays as a centre forward for Serbian club FK Dubočica.

Club career

Radnički Niš
Born in Leskovac, Mitrović passed the youth school of local club Sloga, where he played until summer 2015. Mitrović joined Radnički Niš in the beginning of the 2015–16 season,. He made his SuperLiga debut on 18 March 2016 under coach Milan Rastavac against Novi Pazar. In April 2016, Mitrović signed a five-year professional contract with Radnički Niš. On 30 June 2016, Mitrović scored a brace in a friendly match against new SuperLiga club Bačka. Mitrović made his first appearance for the 2016–17 season in the Serbian Cup match against BSK Borča, played on 21 September 2016. On 24 February 2017, Mitrović moved to Bohemians 1905 on six-month loan deal with an option to break the contract from Radnički Niš.

Career statistics

Club

References

External links
 Lazar Mitrović stats at utakmica.rs 
 
 
 Lazar Mitrović at Sofascore

1998 births
Living people
Sportspeople from Leskovac
Association football forwards
Serbian footballers
FK Radnički Niš players
Serbian SuperLiga players
Serbian expatriate footballers
Serbian expatriate sportspeople in the Czech Republic
Expatriate footballers in the Czech Republic
Bohemians 1905 players